Gangsta Advisory Records is the independent record label headed by Daz Dillinger. Some sources state the hierarchy of Daz's labels were flipped 2003 by ordering D.P.G. Recordz under G.A.R. to become its subsidiary and endorsing all license rights of D.P.G.

Discography 
Daz Dillinger - R.A.W
Daz Dillinger - This Is The Life I Lead
Daz Dillinger - To Live and Die in CA 
Daz Dillinger - I Got Love in These Streetz - The Album
Daz Dillinger - DPGC: U Know What I'm Throwin' Up
Daz Dillinger - Tha Dogg Pound Gangsta LP
Daz Dillinger - Gangsta Crunk
Daz Dillinger - Gangsta Party
Daz Dillinger - Only on the Left Side
Daz Dillinger - Public Enemiez
Daz Dillinger - Matter of Dayz
Daz Dillinger - D.A.Z.
Daz Dillinger - Witit Witit
Daz Dillinger - Weed Money
Kurupt - Same Day, Different Shit
Soopafly - Dat Whoopty Woop
Soopafly - Bangin Westcoast
Soopafly - Best Kept Secret 
Daz Dillinger & JT The Bigga Figga - From Long Beach 2 Fillmoe
Daz Dillinger & JT The Bigga Figga - Game for Sale
Who Ride Wit Us: Tha Compalation, Vol. 1
Who Ride Wit Us: Tha Compalation, Vol. 2
Who Ride Wit Us: Tha Compalation, Vol. 3
Who Ride Wit Us: Tha Compalation, Vol. 4
Who Ride Wit Us: Tha Compalation, Vol. 5
Who Ride Wit Us: Tha Compalation, Vol. 6
Tha Dogg Pound - Dillinger & Young Gotti
Tha Dogg Pound - The Last of Tha Pound 
Tha Dogg Pound - Dillinger & Young Gotti II: Tha Saga Continuez...
Tha Dogg Pound - Dogg Chit
Tha Dogg Pound - Let's Ryde 2Night EP
Tha Dogg Pound - That Was Then, This Is Now
Tha Dogg Pound - Keep on Ridin
Tha Dogg Pound - 100 Wayz
RBX - Ripp Tha Game Bloody: Street Muzic
Lil' C-Style - Blacc Balled
Daz & WC - West Coast Gangsta Sh*t

Management 
CEO : Daz Dillinger
VP of Marketing and Promotions : Arnold "Bigg A" White

Official Djs 
DJ Strong (Cali Untouchables)
DJ Warrior (Cali Untouchables)

Artists 
Daz Dillinger
Tha Dogg Pound (Daz & Kurupt)
Kurupt
Soopafly
Lil' C-Style
Bad Azz

Sister labels 
D.P.G. Recordz
Penagon Recordz
Fly2k Recordz
Double Dollar Sign Recordz
Antra Records
Doggystyle Records

See also 
 List of record labels

References

External links 
Soundslam News

American independent record labels
Hip hop record labels
Record labels established in 2000
Gangsta rap record labels